Kick the Can Crew is a mainstream hip hop group from Tokyo, Japan, consisting of members Kreva, MCU, and Little.

Formed in 1996, the group enjoyed popularity for their top singles "Good Music" and "Sayonara Sayonara". Warner/east west released their albums Vitalizer, Young Kings, a self-titled album, Magic Number, and a greatest hits CD.

Kick the Can Crew have made frequent appearances on Japan's music television station, Space Shower TV, since their debut.

Kreva, the main contributor to the band, won Japan's MC Battle three consecutive years, and has gone on to collaborate with several other groups, mainly Japanese ones, such as Hirai Ken.

In 2004, the group disbanded to concentrate on their respective solo careers. Kreva has been the most visible of the band since their break-up, releasing several singles and albums with great success.

The group reunited and released a new album called Kick! in 2017.

Discography

Albums

Singles

External links
 animefringe.com
 A simple review of Vitalizer
  Kick the Can Crew official site
  Kick the Can Crew at Warner Music Group Japan
  CD Japan sale page for Kick!

References

Japanese hip hop groups
Japanese hip hop musicians
Japanese hip hop
Japanese pop music groups
1996 establishments in Japan
Musical groups from Tokyo
Musical groups established in 1996